Mehmet Fikret Kuşkan (born 22 April 1965) is a Turkish actor.

Kuşkan grew up in İstinye with his parents and four sisters. His father was of Albanian origin. When he was 13, his father died and he moved to Tokat. After three years, he returned to İstanbul and began studying at Hasköy Lisesi.  He graduated from Istanbul University's theatre conservatory.

Kuşkan made his film debut in Sis which was written by Zülfü Livaneli and played the role of a photographer in the TRT series Gençler. He appeared in İki Başlı Dev with  Cüneyt Arkın. Next, he starred in Ömer Kavur's Gizli Yüz which he followed with roles in C Blok, Çakalların İçinde, Yaz Yağmuru, Sahte Dünyalar, Özlem Düne Bugüne Yarına, Aşk Üzerine Söylenmemiş Herşey, Deniz Bekliyordu, Kurtuluş, Avcı and Dokuz.

Kuşkan then successfully starred in a series of Çağan Irmak's productions Yolculuk, Mustafa Hakkında Herşey, Babam ve Oğlum and Kabuslar Evi. He was given the Best actor award at the 25th Istanbul Film Festival for his performance in Babam ve Oğlum.

Filmography

Awards and nominations 

|-
| 1991
| 28th Antalya Golden Orange Film Festival
| "Best Actor", (Gizli Yüz)
| 
|-
| 2002
| 14th Ankara International Film Festival| "Best Actor", (9)| 
|-
| 2006
| 25th International Istanbul Film Festival
| "Best Actor", (Babam ve Oğlum)''
| 
|-
|}

References

External links
 

1965 births
Living people
Male actors from Istanbul
Turkish male film actors
Turkish male television actors
Turkish male stage actors
Turkish people of Albanian descent
Istanbul University alumni